Çalpınar is a village in the Midyat District of Mardin Province in Turkey. The village is populated by Kurds of the Omerkan tribe and had a population of 493 in 2021.

References 

Villages in Midyat District
Kurdish settlements in Mardin Province